The Great Citizen is a 1938 Soviet biopic film directed by Fridrikh Ermler.

A fictionalized biography of Sergei Kirov (the character's name is Shakhov), the film was intended as ideological support for the Great Purges; it depicts life in USSR during the 1920s and 1930s.

Stalin made direct interventions in Mikhail Bleiman and Manuel Bolshintsov's screenplay. During the making of The Great Citizen four people associated with it were arrested. In the press Ermler and his screenwriters were obliged to condemn the "wrecker" leadership of Lenfilm, most importantly Piotrovski.

Cast
 Nikolay Bogolyubov - Shakhov - the great citizen
 Ivan Bersenev - Kartashov - the conspirator
 Oleg Zhakov - Borovsky - the accomplice
 Zoya Fyodorova - Nadya
 Boris Poslavsky - Sizov
 Aleksandr Zrazhevsky - Dubok
 Boris Chirkov - Maksim, the investigator
 Pyotr Kirillov - Briantsev - the assassin
 Yefim Altus - Katz - Shakhov's helper
 Yelena Yegorova		
 Yevgeni Pankov		
 Yevgeni Nemchenko - Dronov
 Georgi Semyonov - Kolesnikov
 V. Kiselyov - Gladkikh
 A. Polibin - Solovyev
 Sergei Kurilov		
 N. Raiskaya-Dore - Shakhov's mother
 Natalya Rashevskaya - Olga
 K. Ryabinkin - Kryuchkov

References

External links

Soviet biographical films
Russian biographical films
Soviet television films
1938 films
1930s biographical films
1939 films
Films directed by Fridrikh Ermler
Soviet black-and-white films
Films scored by Dmitri Shostakovich
Russian black-and-white films
1930s television films